The 1965–66 WHL season was the 14th season of the Western Hockey League. Six teams played a 72-game schedule, and the Victoria Maple Leafs were the Lester Patrick Cup champions, defeating the as Portland Buckaroos four games to three in the final series.

Billy McNeill of Vancouver was named the most valuable player, while Cliff Schmautz of Portland led the league in scoring.

Final Standings 

bold - qualified for playoffs

Playoffs 

The Victoria Maple Leafs defeated the Portland Buckaroos 4 games to 3 to win the Lester Patrick Cup.

References

Bibliography

 

Western Hockey League (1952–1974) seasons
1965–66 in American ice hockey by league
1965–66 in Canadian ice hockey by league